Erebus Montes is a group of mountains in the Diacria quadrangle of Mars, located at 35.66° North and 185.02° West.  It is 811 km across and was named after an albedo feature at 26N, 182W.

References 

Mountains on Mars
Diacria quadrangle